is the 14th single by J-pop artist Maki Goto, released on 25 January 2006 with the catalog number PKCP-5060 under the Piccolo Town label. The Single V was released a week later on 1 February, with the catalog number PKBP-5042. The single peaked at #12 on the Oricon weekly singles chart, charting for four weeks.

The title song's theme is "a girl's motivation".

Track listings

Concert performances 
 Hello Pro Party! 2006: Maki Goto Captain Kōen
 Hello Pro On Stage! 2007 "Rock Desu yo!" (with Melon Kinenbi)

Oricon rank and sales 

Total sales: 21,409

External links 

 Up-Front Works discography entries: CD, DVD

References

2006 singles
Songs written by Tsunku
Maki Goto songs
Song recordings produced by Tsunku
2006 songs
Piccolo Town singles